Svein Tuft (born May 9, 1977) is a Canadian former road bicycle racer, who rode professionally between 2005 and 2019 for the , , ,  and  teams. Tuft was the winner of the 2006–07 UCI America Tour, and was a thirteen-time champion at the Canadian road cycling championships: twice in the road race, and eleven times in the time trial.

Personal life
He was born in Langley, British Columbia, Canada. His grandfather, Arne Tuft, was an Olympic cross-country skier from Norway.

Tuft dropped out of school at 15 to travel and camp with his dog named Bear. He spent the next several years mountain climbing and going on long bike trips, including a 4,000 mile trip to Alaska as a teenager.

In the adjacent trailer was Tuft's teammate Christian Meier. The team referred to the two as the trailer park boys.

Racing career

Symmetrics (2005–2008)
Tuft first raced in 1999, at the British Columbia Provincial Championships.  Strong results landed him a place on the Broadmark Capital team, followed by short stints on the Mercury and Prime Alliance teams. Tuft's career flourished when he rode for the Canadian  team – a prominent team in North American Cycling from 2005 to 2008. He first captured the Canadian national time trial title in 2004 from his former teammate and three time Canadian Olympian Eric Wohlberg. Wohlberg held the title for eight consecutive years prior to Tuft.  In 2007 Tuft conceded the Canadian National Time Trial title to Ryder Hesjedal.

He was selected to compete for Canada at the 2008 Summer Olympics in Beijing China in the Road Race and Time Trial. Svein Tuft was the best finisher for a long time in the time trial, before eventually finishing 7th.

His best result was second place in the 2008 UCI World Championships time trial in Varese Italy during which he overcame a flat tire in the last 5 km.

He featured prominently in a  team Comic book written by Marvel Comics Dabel Brothers Productions Editor in chief Matthew Hansen, which is used as a press kit for the team.  In the comic book, Tuft is very muscular. Upon seeing himself in the comic, Tuft remarked "We're all a bunch of sissies really."

SpiderTech–C10 (2011)
In 2011 Svein Tuft was supposed to be a part of Team Pegasus Cycling.  Unfortunately due to sponsorship issues, the team had to pull out at the last minute.  Tuft was recruited as a member of the Canadian Professional Pro-Continental Team, managed by Steve Bauer.  Tuft won both the Canadian National Time Trial and Canadian National Road championships in Burlington, Ontario with SpiderTech in 2011. In August 2011, Tuft announced that he would leave SpiderTech for the Australian team  in 2012.

GreenEDGE (2012–2018)

2012 season
He was praised for his  solo ride in front of the peloton during stage 2 of the 2012 Tirreno–Adriatico. During the race, he reportedly burnt 6500 calories. Mark Cavendish tweeted it as "Ride of the day.. No, make that ride of the millennium, goes to GreenEDGE's Svein Tuft. 200km ALONE controlling the peloton! Respect."

In August 2012, Tuft prevailed on stage 6 of the Eneco Tour, a  Individual Time Trial. The victory put him in the overall classification leader's jersey. He lost the lead the next day on the seventh and last stage of the Tour, where he had to face the steep climbs of the Belgian "bergs."

2013 season
The  course was swept by strong winds, according to Tuft. In July, he was the lanterne rouge – final-placed rider overall – of the 100th Tour de France.

2014 season
In 2014, Tuft wore the maglia rosa as leader of the Giro d'Italia since  won the opening team time trial and he crossed the line first. He stated afterward: "For a guy like me, to wear the maglia rosa is a once in a lifetime experience, and I’m really thankful to my team for that gift. It’s a really special thing."

2015 season
In 2015, Tuft crashed at the Tour de Romandie as he was carrying water bottles to give to his teammates. He was a non-starter for the third stage. It was later revealed after medical examination that he had suffered a minor wrist fracture and a sternum injury, and was therefore pulled out of 's Giro d'Italia's roster.

Major results

2001
 1st Stage 7 Tour de Beauce
 2nd Time trial, National Road Championships
2002
 3rd Time trial, National Road Championships
2003
 2nd Time trial, National Road Championships
2004
 National Road Championships
1st  Time trial
2nd Road race
2005
 1st  Time trial, National Road Championships
 2nd Overall Tour de Beauce
2006
 National Road Championships
1st  Time trial
2nd Road race
 1st Prologue Vuelta a El Salvador
 4th Time trial, Pan American Road Championships
 7th Time trial, Commonwealth Games
 10th Overall Vuelta a Chihuahua
1st Prologue
2007
 1st 2006–07 UCI America Tour
 1st  Overall Vuelta a Cuba
1st Stage 11a (ITT)
 1st U.S. Open Cycling Championships
 1st Stage 1 Redlands Bicycle Classic
 2nd Time trial, National Road Championships
 2nd Overall Tour de Beauce
 5th Lancaster Classic
 7th Overall Vuelta a El Salvador
2008
 Pan American Road and Track Championships
1st  Time trial
1st  Individual pursuit
1st  Madison (with Zachary Bell)
1st  Points race
 1st  Time trial, National Road Championships
 1st  Overall Tour de Beauce
1st Stage 4a (ITT)
 2nd  Time trial, UCI Road World Championships
 3rd Overall Tour of Missouri
 7th Time trial, Olympic Games
2009
 1st  Time trial, National Road Championships
 4th Overall Herald Sun Tour
2010
 1st  Time trial, National Road Championships
 2nd Overall Danmark Rundt
1st Stage 5 (ITT)
 5th Overall Eneco Tour
1st Prologue
 10th Overall Delta Tour Zeeland
2011
 National Road Championships
1st  Time trial
1st  Road race
 1st Grote Prijs Stad Zottegem
 3rd Overall Tour de Beauce
1st Stages 4 (ITT) & 6
2012
 1st  Time trial, National Road Championships
 1st Duo Normand (with Luke Durbridge)
 1st Stage 1 (TTT) Tirreno–Adriatico
 3rd  Team time trial, UCI Road World Championships
 4th Overall Three Days of De Panne
 4th Overall Tour de Beauce
1st Stage 4 (ITT)
 7th Overall Eneco Tour
1st Stages 2 (TTT) & 6 (ITT)
2013
 1st Duo Normand (with Luke Durbridge)
 1st Stage 4 (TTT) Tour de France
 1st Stage 4 (ITT) Tour de San Luis
 1st Stage 1 (ITT) Tour of Slovenia
 2nd  Team time trial, UCI Road World Championships
2014
 National Road Championships
1st  Time trial
1st  Road race
 Giro d'Italia
1st Stage 1 (TTT)
Held  after Stage 1
 2nd  Team time trial, UCI Road World Championships
 2nd Overall Tour du Poitou-Charentes
 4th Time trial, Commonwealth Games
2016
 1st Duo Normand (with Luke Durbridge)
 3rd  Team time trial, UCI Road World Championships
 3rd Time trial, National Road Championships
2017
 1st  Time trial, National Road Championships
2018
 1st  Time trial, National Road Championships
 10th Overall Tour de Beauce
2019
 2nd Time trial, National Road Championships

Grand Tour general classification results timeline

Notes

References

External links

 Symmetrics Cycling
 BikingBros Blog (with teammate Christian Meier)
 Palmares at Cycling Base

1977 births
Living people
Canadian male cyclists
Sportspeople from British Columbia
Cyclists at the 2008 Summer Olympics
Olympic cyclists of Canada
Canadian people of Norwegian descent
People from Langley, British Columbia (city)
Commonwealth Games competitors for Canada
Cyclists at the 2014 Commonwealth Games